Asthenotricha dentatissima is a moth in the family Geometridae. It was described by William Warren in 1899. It is found in the Democratic Republic of the Congo, Kenya, South Africa, Tanzania and Uganda.

References

Moths described in 1899
Asthenotricha
Moths of Africa
Taxa named by William Warren (entomologist)